Vadi is a surname. People with the surname include:

 Mohammad Taher Vadi (born 1989), Iranian volleyball player
 Quinto Vadi (1921–2014), Italian gymnast
 Urmas Vadi (born 1977), Estonian writer

See also
 Vadi (disambiguation)